Milagro ("Miracle") (2003) is the third Latin album by Christian singer Jaci Velasquez. This record won a Billboard Latin Music Award in the category "Best Christian Album". Although lyrically considered the most secular of all her works, the album was not as successful as her previous Spanish works due to Sony Discos changing hands in management that same year and a lack of promotion. The album was nominated for "Best Female Pop Vocal Album" at the Latin Grammy Awards in 2004.

Track listing
"En El Centro De Mi Corazón" (In the Center of My Heart)
"No Hace Falta Un Hombre" (English version: I Don't Need a Man)
"Milagro" (Miracle)
"Un Trocito De Cielo" (A Little Piece of Heaven)
"Perdida Sin Ti" (Lost Without You)
"Eres Tan Grande" (You're So Great)
"A Un Paso De Mi Amor" (At One Step of My Love) (English version: Just a Prayer Away)
"Me Valga Dios" (Help Me God)
"Es Amor" (It's Love)
"A Tu Lado Es Mi Lugar" (My Place Is By Your Side) (English version: Where I Belong)
"Mi Vida No Es Nada Sin Ti" (My Life Is Nothing Without You)

Single

 "No Hace Falta Un Hombre" (a video was made for this song)

 "A Un Paso De Mi Amor", the Spanish version of "Just a Prayer Away", is only based musically but not lyrically.
 "Mi Vida No Es Nada Sin Ti" is the Spanish version of "Can't Stay Away from You" by Gloria Estefan. 
 "No Hace Falta Un Hombre" was the theme song in the film Chasing Papi.

Personnel

 Diego Acosta – assistant engineer
 N. Amador – assistant engineer
 Tommy Anthony – background vocals
 Randall Barlow – composer, producer
 Bridget Benenate – composer
 Kurt Berge – technical support
 Andres Bermudez – engineer, mixing
 Scott Canto – engineer
 Alban Christ – photography
 Hunter Davis – composer
 Kevin Dillon – production coordination
 Vicky Echeverri – choir, chorus, background vocals
 Emilio Estefan, Jr. – composer, producer
 Gloria Estefan – composer
 Estéfano – producer
 Mike Fuller – mastering
 Javier Garza – mixing engineer
 Mauricio Gasca – programming, background vocals
 Matthew Gerrard – arranger, composer, engineer, instrumentation, mixing, producer
 Julio Hernandez – bass
 David J. Holman – mixing
 Alejandro Jaén – producer, background vocals
 Amado Jaen – composer
 Leyla Leeming – production coordination
 Oscar Llord – executive producer
 Alejandro López – art direction, graphic design
 Dionicio R. Lopez – A&R
 Manny López – composer, guitar
 Steve Menezes – studio coordinator
 Bart Migal – engineer
 Mario Patiño – general assistance, text
 Andy Pechenik – technical support
 Wendy Pederson – choir, chorus
 Archie Pena – percussion
 Betsy Perez – production coordination
 Lena Pérez – background vocals
 Rudy Pérez – arranger, choir, chorus, composer, engineer, producer, string arrangements
 Clay Perry – arranger, keyboards, programming
 Jorge Luís piloto – composer
 Daniel Ponce – assistant engineer
 Mark Portmann – composer
 Julio C. Reyes – arranger, composer, piano, programming
 Jon Secada – composer
 Ron Taylor – engineer
 Ramiro Teran – choir, chorus
 Ken Theis – assistant engineer
 E. Thomas – background vocals
 Michael Hart thompson – guitar
 Nicolás Tovar – composer
 Gisa Vatcky – background vocals
 Jaci Velasquez – composer
 Dan Warner – acoustic guitar, electric guitar
 Bruce Weeden – mixing engineer
 Betty Wright – choir, chorus

Charts

References

2003 albums
Jaci Velasquez albums